Vanesa Agović (born 30 March 1996 in Berane, Montenegro) is a Montenegrin professional handball player who plays for the club ŽRK Budućnost Podgorica.

Professional career 

Agović has played for the Montenegro national team, in 2012 at under-14 level, in 2013 at under-16, where they  finished in 5th place at the European championship in Poland and 1st place at the  Mediterranean Games held in Montenegro, in 2014 at the under-16 World Championship in Macedonia, where they were 4th, in 2015 at under-18, and in 2018 for the senior team in Tarragona, Spain), where they finished 2nd.

Before she joined Vasas SC she played for Slagels HF, Frederiksberg IF, Viborg, WHC Danilovgrad, ZKR Buducnost Podgorica.

Personal life 
Her mother is the former montenegrin handball player, Maja Savić.

References

1996 births
Living people
Montenegrin female handball players
People from Berane
Competitors at the 2018 Mediterranean Games
Mediterranean Games silver medalists for Montenegro
Mediterranean Games medalists in handball